Faita may be:

Faita language
FAITA